Pierre Lumbi Okongo (11 March 195014 June 2020) was a politician in the Democratic Republic of the Congo.

Early career
Lumbi was one of the founders of the Peasant Solidarity (Solidarité Paysanne) movement, which gained legal status in 1985. The initial purpose was to help the rural masses express their problems, resist forced cultivation of cotton, facilitate sales of their crops and help them find new business opportunities. After establishing a National Council of NGOs, the movement began making political demands, calling for a multiparty system at a conference in Kinshasa in 1991. Lumbi joined the government of Étienne Tshisekedi in August 1992 and April 1993, where he was Minister of Foreign Affairs. He joined the government of Kengo wa Dondo in July 1994 as Minister of Posts and Telecommunications. He was national security advisor to President Joseph Kabila from January 2001.

Lumbi was Minister of Foreign Affairs during the transition. He was the head of the Mouvement Social pour le Renouveau (MSR) party, formed for the 2006 elections. The MSR had its roots in the "Solidarité Paysanne" movement of the 1980s and 1990s.

Infrastructure and Public Works Ministry
Lumbi was appointed Minister of State for Infrastructure, Public Works and Reconstruction on 5 February 2007, in the first cabinet of Prime Minister Antoine Gizenga. In the second cabinet, announced on 25 November 2007, he retained the ministry. He was confirmed in the ministry on 26 October 2008, in the first cabinet of Prime Minister Adolphe Muzito.

In 2007 Lumbi visited Beijing, laying the groundwork for an important economic agreement with China. The deal provides for 6.3 billion euros of investment, with 4.2 billion for public infrastructure development and 2.1 for mining works. Project management would be the responsibility of a joint enterprise, Sicomines, in which the DRC holds 32% of shares. The work would be assigned to the China Railway Engineering Corporation (CREC) and Synohydro Corporation, two Chinese corporations. It would include construction of roads and railways, hospitals, universities and housing. In return, the Chinese were promised access to copper, cobalt and gold supplies. The barter arrangement reduced the possibility of corruption, an important consideration in the DRC.

In 2009 the World Bank expressed concern about the way the projects were being managed. A commission set up by the DRC National Assembly found that over US$23 million in signature bonuses had gone missing, apparently siphoned off by local government officials and officers of the state-owned Gecamnines. There were also complaints that the Chinese were failing to use local labor as agreed, and were using cheap imported materials for projects not covered by the project. Some parts of the project had stalled.

Later career
In the second Muzito cabinet, announced in February 2010, he was replaced as Minister for Infrastructure by Fridolin Kasweshi Musoka. He was named special advisor to President Joseph Kabila on matters of security. Lumbi's Mouvement social pour le renouveau was preparing to compete in the upcoming elections as a member of Kabila's ruling coalition.

From 2018, till his death from Covid-19, Lumbi served as a member of the Senate.

Death
On 14 June 2020, Lumbi died in Kinshasa from COVID-19 during the COVID-19 pandemic in the Democratic Republic of the Congo.

References

1950 births
2020 deaths
Deaths from the COVID-19 pandemic in the Democratic Republic of the Congo
Government ministers of the Democratic Republic of the Congo
Unified Lumumbist Party politicians